Sword Coast Legends is a 2015 action role-playing game. The game is set within the universe of Forgotten Realms, a campaign setting of Dungeons & Dragons.

Gameplay
The game is an action role-playing video game set within the Dungeons & Dragons universe. It features typical races and classes of the Forgotten Realms setting. The game is set in the fictional Sword Coast region of the continent Faerûn on the planet Toril. Graphics are in 3D. One addition to the game is that it allows players to be a "dungeon master" (or DM), as in the tabletop version of Dungeons & Dragons. It features single-player and co-operative multiplayer modes. The game is available on several platforms including Microsoft Windows, OS X, Linux, PlayStation 4, and Xbox One. It was released in 2015. The game was directed by Dan Tudge. Inon Zur, who previously led the music development of Dragon Age: Origins and Fallout 3, composed, produced, and conducted all the music for the game. The music was performed by the City of Prague Philharmonic Orchestra.

Development
The game was developed by n-Space, in collaboration with Digital Extremes, and was released worldwide on October 20, 2015 for Microsoft Windows, OS X, and Linux, with PlayStation 4, and Xbox One versions coming out in 2016. It would be n-Space's last project before they closed in 2016. On December 11, 2017, it was announced via social media that Sword Coast Legends would no longer be available for retail after December 31, 2017, but that their servers would remain operational "for the foreseeable future." The servers were closed on July 25, 2018 and the game can now be played only offline.

Reception

The game was met with a mixed critical reception upon release. Aggregating review website Metacritic gave the Microsoft Windows version 61/100 based on 39 reviews. PC Gamer awarded it a score of 55%, calling it "A straightforward cliché that feels out of place in the new wave of cRPGs." IGN awarded it a score of 5.5 out of 10, saying "Poor creation tools and an aversion to genuine, interesting decision-making keep Sword Coast Legends from succeeding."

References

External links
 

2015 video games
Forgotten Realms video games
Linux games
MacOS games
PlayStation 4 games
Role-playing video games
Video games developed in the United States
Video games featuring protagonists of selectable gender
Video games scored by Inon Zur
Video games with isometric graphics
Windows games
Xbox One games